Kamion may refer to:
Kamion, Łódź Voivodeship (central Poland)
Kamion, Płock County in Masovian Voivodeship (east-central Poland)
Kamion, Sochaczew County in Masovian Voivodeship (east-central Poland)
Kamion, Żyrardów County in Masovian Voivodeship (east-central Poland)
 Kamion Dolny
 Nowy Kamion